is a Japanese athlete. She competed in the women's high jump at the 1964 Summer Olympics.

References

1943 births
Living people
Athletes (track and field) at the 1964 Summer Olympics
Japanese female high jumpers
Olympic athletes of Japan
Place of birth missing (living people)
20th-century Japanese women